Jamaica is a major train station of the Long Island Rail Road located in Jamaica, Queens, New York City. With weekday ridership exceeding 200,000 passengers, it is the largest transit hub on Long Island, the fourth-busiest rail station in North America, and the second-busiest station that exclusively serves commuter traffic. It is the third-busiest rail hub in the New York area, behind Penn Station and Grand Central Terminal. Over 1,000 trains pass through each day, the fourth-most in the New York area behind Penn Station, Grand Central Terminal, and Secaucus Junction.

The Jamaica station is located on an embankment above street level and contains six platforms and ten tracks for LIRR trains. A concourse above the LIRR platforms connects to a station on the AirTrain JFK elevated people mover to John F. Kennedy International Airport, which contains two tracks and one platform. There are also connections to the Archer Avenue lines of the New York City Subway at a separate station directly below. The area just outside is served by several local bus routes, and others terminate within a few blocks of the station.

All LIRR services except the Port Washington Branch pass through Jamaica station. The Main Line westwards leads to  station in Queens and to Penn Station in Manhattan via Woodside, while the Atlantic Branch diverges along Atlantic Avenue to Atlantic Terminal in Brooklyn. Prior to December 2012, the Montauk Branch served one daily trip to  station via Richmond Hill, Queens. East of Jamaica, these three lines diverge, with some branch services using the Main Line, some using the Atlantic Branch, and some using the Montauk Branch.

Because of its central location on all services (except the Port Washington Branch), it is common for commuters to "change at Jamaica", or switch trains to reach their final destination. After the opening of East Side Access in 2023, the southernmost platform at Jamaica has been used primarily by shuttle trains to and from Atlantic Terminal, while through services continue to Long Island City, Penn Station, and Grand Central Madison.

History

Original stations
Two former stations existed in Jamaica prior to the current one, serving two different railroads. The first was the LIRR's original Jamaica Station ("Old Jamaica"), built c. 1836 as the terminus of the LIRR. It was remodeled in 1869 and again in 1872, only to be completely rebuilt between 1882–83 adjacent to and in use concurrently with the original depot. Covered platforms were later installed. "Old Jamaica" station at what is now 153rd Street (0.4 mile east of the present station) was razed in 1912 with the grade elimination project, the "Jamaica Improvements". 

The other station known as Jamaica–Beaver Street was built by the South Side Railroad of Long Island on the Atlantic Branch. It opened on October 28, 1867. It was razed in 1871 and replaced on Christmas Day of the same year. When the LIRR acquired the SSRRLI in 1867, the depot was moved to the south side of Beaver Street crossing on a stub track. Low platforms for this station stop were located on the north side of Beaver Street crossing. From 1908–1913, the station stop was listed as "Jamaica (Beaver Street)." Jamaica–Beaver Street station was razed with the grade elimination in 1913. No trace of the Jamaica–Beaver Street station exists today.

Construction of current station
The present Jamaica station was designed by Kenneth M. Murchison and built between 1912 and 1913 as a replacement for the two former stations in Jamaica. Both former stations were discontinued as station stops. The 1912–13 "Jamaica Improvement" was the final step in consolidating the branch lines of the LIRR. To the west of the station, Jay Interlocking was built, and to the east, Hall Interlocking was constructed. These interlockings allowed any line to reach any other line, allowing easy transfer between lines at Jamaica station, which is the hallmark of current day LIRR service.

The LIRR thus decided to add a new Union Hall Street station in 1913. (The Union Hall Street station closed on May 20, 1977.)

After the merging of Beaver Street station with the new Jamaica Station, the LIRR built a replacement along the Atlantic/Far Rockaway Branch southeast of the former SSRRLI depot. It was named "South Street station" and was located on what is today South Road between 157th and 159th Streets. Originally the site of the "SJ Tower," which was used to keep trolleys and trains from colliding with one another until the grade crossing was eliminated in 1913, it was built on November 15, 1917. Due to the close proximity to Jamaica Station, the New York Public Service Commission granted them permission to close the station on March 28, 1922. It was finally closed in June of that year.

On August 15, 1955, LIRR officials announced that it would install a complicated arrangement of signals and switches to the east of the station within two weeks for nearly $100,000 to allow eastbound express trains in the evening rush hour to bypass the station via the station's westbound tracks. The LIRR was in the process of planning improvements to the station's west to allow westbound express trains in the morning rush hour to run via the station's eastbound tracks.

1994 renovation 
In September 1983, the LIRR announced that De Leuw, Cather & Company would complete a conceptual design for the construction of express bypass tracks through the station. As part of the $2.1 million contract, De Leuw would complete a conceptional design by September 1984, with final design and engineering to be completed by September 1985. The project, which would also study the consolidation of towers into a master tower, was intended to increase capacity and reduce train congestion.

In 1986, the LIRR announced a $209 million renovation to the station complex to alleviate the bottleneck. As part of the plan, which would be funded in the proposed $8.3 billion 1987-1991 Capital Program, the station approaches would be modified to allow trains to use a greater number of tracks at increased speeds, platforms would be extended, an additional platform would be added. In addition, a new master tower would be constructed, replacing three older towers, and an express track would be installed through the middle of the station to allow trains bypassing the station to pass through at 45 miles per hour, instead of passing through at 15 miles per hour. In addition, a passenger overpass would be constructed. The project was expected to reduce travel times by two to seven minutes, increase capacity, allowing for increased rush hour service, and increase operating flexibility. The implementation of the plan was scheduled in eleven separate phases. The plan would have rebuilt six miles of tracks on the Main Line between the Van Wyck Expressway and Bellerose, and construct a new southern platform.

On July 13, 1987, LIRR officials announced that the station renovation would take two years longer than the initial plan, with completion now scheduled for 1993, and that the project's budget was increased from $213 million to $320 million. A third of the increased cost came from the addition of two years to the project, with some of the rest of the cost coming from underestimated labor and material costs. LIRR President Bruce McIver said that the initial timetable would have had too great of an impact on service performance. The project had been scheduled to start in 1988, but MTA President Robert Kiley said that he did not anticipate that the modified plans would be completed in time to start work then. On September 14, 1987, it was announced that the cost of the project was increased further to $342.5 million. The plan for the project was split in two sections, with one in the 1987-1991 Capital Program, and the other in the 1992-1996 Capital Program. The first phase, which was slated to begin in 1988 and be completed by 1994 and would cost $192.5 million, would construct a new master control tower and a rider overpass, and install new signals and switches. The second phase, which would cost $150 million, would move platforms to provide space for the construction of westbound and eastbound express tracks through the station and build some elevated trackage. Work would begin after 1991 and be completed by 1999.

In 1988, plans were announced for a $209 million station renovation that was expected to be completed in 1994. The project would add elevators, new staircases, overhauled platforms, new tracks, a second pedestrian overpass, and a second pedestrian bridge to be located at the eastern end of the station, connecting all the platforms. A lower-level concourse would be added to provide additional route for riders. Two connections were added to the new Archer Avenue Line.

In April 1988, construction began on an $11.3 million overpass, which would be between the east end concourse and the west end of the platforms. The project would add elevators to the five platforms to make the station accessible, and an elevator between street level near the waiting room to the overpass.

On September 11, 1989, the LIRR announced that it had dropped most of its planned reconstruction of Jamaica due to changes in commuting patterns and technology. $84 million would still be allocated for the construction of a pedestrian overpass and elevators, and for design and engineering work. Work on the elevators and overpass began in April 1988, and was expected to be completed in January 1990. The money saved from deferring most of the project would be used to offset overruns in the cost of improvements at Penn Station, and for other projects.

2001–2006 expansion

A $387 million renovation project began in 2001 and was completed in 2006. It was carried out in conjunction with the construction of AirTrain JFK's terminal (the Port Authority of New York and New Jersey contributed $100 million toward the project).

The project had two goals. Passenger-oriented renovations included new platforms and a pedestrian bridge, a central elevator bank linking the LIRR to the street and to the Sutphin Boulevard subway station, a new mezzanine connecting to AirTrain and a new steel and glass canopy over the elevated tracks. The focal point of the project was the Jamaica Control Center, built by Tishman Construction Corporation and Bechtel. The JCC houses the LIRR offices, railroad control center and MTA Police. Overall, the renovations enlarged the station and have made it more modern and efficient, providing easier access to all eight LIRR tracks. The entire station complex, including AirTrain and the subway, is compliant with the Americans with Disabilities Act of 1990 (ADA). The project was named "2006 Project of the Year" by the Long Island branch of the American Society of Civil Engineers.

2015–2021 capacity improvements

As part of a series of LIRR readiness projects in preparation for the East Side Access extension to Grand Central Terminal, the MTA had adjusted track layouts at Jamaica station to straighten train paths and install high-speed switches. As part of the project, additional ladder tracks have been created, the E Yard track was extended over 150th Street, the East Layup Track was converted to be a through route. In addition, most Brooklyn service will be converted into a shuttle service. This shuttle will operate between Atlantic Terminal in Brooklyn and Jamaica via the Atlantic Branch. A new Platform F and dedicated tracks have been constructed south of the existing LIRR platforms at Jamaica station to serve the shuttles; passengers traveling between Brooklyn and Long Island will be required to make a walking transfer between this new platform and the existing platforms.

Service frequency will increase for trains on the Atlantic Branch; trains will run every 7.5 minutes during rush hours and every 15 minutes during off-peak hours. It will allow for a 40% increase in peak-hour service between Jamaica and Manhattan. However, the project has been criticized because it would eliminate most direct service from Long Island to Brooklyn, thereby increasing commute time between the two destinations.

Completion of Phase I, which includes the new platform, was originally projected for January 2018. The completion date was later pushed back to July 2019, but , is planned to be finished in 2021 at a cost of $380 million. The platform itself was to be completed at the end of 2019, while the track and surrounding infrastructure would be completed in late 2020, and track interlockings would be completed by late 2021. The platform ultimately opened in February 2020 after several delays. Additional improvements, to cost over $1 billion, were to be constructed starting as early as 2022; designs for these improvements started in June 2017 and were scheduled to be completed in 2021.

Station layout

Jamaica is the Long Island Rail Road's hub station. There are six high-level island platforms. Trains on tracks 2 and 7 utilize a Spanish solution boarding layout, as these trains can be entered from platforms on either side, allowing passengers to quickly transfer between three trains at once. During the morning rush westbound trains from three different lines bound for three different terminals are scheduled to arrive at Jamaica simultaneously on tracks 1, 2, and 3. Passengers can cross to the train for their destination by passing through the train on track 2 (or by the stairs). In the evening the process is reversed: trains from three New York terminals destined for three branches arrive on tracks 6, 7, and 8 and allow commuters to cross to the desired outbound train. The middle tracks – 4 and 5 – share a platform which is used during rush hours to allow passengers to transfer to their destination train on the other side of the platform.

The sixth platform, Platform F, serves tracks 11–12 and is shorter than the other platforms. It is located to the south of platforms A–E and is used by shuttles to and from Atlantic Terminal. Tracks 9–10 are not adjacent to any platforms and can be used by non-revenue passenger trains or by freight trains.

The main entrance to the station, where tickets may be purchased and where waiting areas are located, is a 100-year-old building that also serves as the offices and headquarters of the Long Island Rail Road Company.

AirTrain station 

The AirTrain station, located in an enclosed glass structure to the south of the LIRR platforms, has 2 tracks and 1 island platform. It is accessed by escalator or elevator from street level as well as via an enclosed bridge connecting it to the LIRR station. Unlike the LIRR platforms, the AirTrain JFK platforms are entirely enclosed and feature platform screen doors, which help the station maintain a constant temperature and prevent passengers from falling onto the tracks. An array of sensors detect a train's position on the track, and only when it is properly aligned will the train's doors open. This enables the AirTrain to use automatic train operation.

The next stop to the south is Federal Circle, followed by the six JFK airline terminal stops. West of the station the track curves to the left and runs south, above the Van Wyck Expressway. Since it is owned by the Port Authority, it uses a separate fare control from the LIRR. Passengers must pay their fare when either entering or leaving the station, as this station and Howard Beach are the only stations where fares are collected. MetroCard vending machines are located on both sides of fare control.

Station layout

Bus and rail connections

Subway connections 
New York City Subway:
 Sutphin Boulevard–Archer Avenue–JFK Airport station on the Archer Avenue Line ( trains)

Bus connections

See also
Long Island Rail Road
East Side Access
Lower Manhattan-Jamaica/JFK Transportation Project
List of busiest railway stations in North America

Notes

References

External links

Port Authority Annual Report 2001  
LIRR History website
 Sutphin Boulevard entrance from Google Maps Street View
 Sutphin Boulevard entrance to AirTrain from Google Maps Street View
 Platforms from Google Maps Street View
 AirTrain JFK platform from Google Maps Street View

Long Island Rail Road stations in New York City
AirTrain JFK stations
Railway stations in Queens, New York
Railway stations in the United States opened in 1836
Railway stations in the United States opened in 1913
Jamaica, Queens
Airport railway stations in the United States
1913 establishments in New York City